Jasmina Ahmetagić (Belgrade, 1970) is a Serbian professor, researcher, literary critic, theorist and poet who has published a number of books analyzing the prose and works of other authors.

Biography
She was born in 1970 in Belgrade. She graduated from the Faculty of Philology in Belgrade, where she received her master's and doctoral degrees with the topic "Biblical subtext of Serbian prose from the second half of the twentieth century (R. Konstantinović, M. Kovač, D. Kiš, M. Pavić, B. Pekić, V. Dobrivojević)". She is a Doctor of Literary Sciences, Associate Professor and Senior Research Associate. She taught at the Zemun Gymnasium, worked twice in the National Library of Serbia, where she was engaged in proofreading. She also taught at the International University and the State University in Novi Pazar, Alfa University in Belgrade and worked at the Institute of Serbian Culture in Kosovo. For the last few years, she worked at the UNESCO International Institute for Educational Planning in Leposavić. On 27 January 2015, she received the "Nikola Milošević" award for the book "The Storyteller and the Story". The award is given for the best work in the field of philosophy, aesthetics and theory of literature and art.

Works
In her 2005 book, The inner side of postmodernism: a look at the theory, Ahmetagić openly and sharply re-examines the literary work of academician Milorad Pavić, mostly the one who was defended by critics at any cost, and most often with postmodernist theoretical apparatus. The first part of the book examines Pavić as, according to postmodern critics, the most valuable and typical representative of Serbian postmodernism, and the second part of the book examines postmodernism itself, from the point of view of the statements given to it by its proponents.

Selected works

References 

1970 births
Living people
University of Belgrade alumni
Literary theorists
Literary critics of Serbian
Serbian literary critics
Women literary critics
20th-century Serbian women writers
21st-century Serbian women writers
Academic staff of the International University of Novi Pazar
Academic staff of the State University of Novi Pazar